Edson Alfredo da Costa Ndoniema (born February 11, 1991) is an Angolan professional basketball player. Ndoniema, who stands at 191 cm (6'4"), plays as a small forward.

In May 2013, Ndoniema was called up for the 2013 Afrobasket preliminary Angolan squad.

Ndoniema is currently playing for Angolan side Primeiro de Agosto at the Angolan basketball league BAI Basket and at the Africa Champions Cup.

Edson is married to fellow Angolan basketball player Sónia Ndoniema.

References

External links 

 2009 FIBA World Cup U-19 Stats
 2008 FIBA Africa Championship Stats

1991 births
Living people
Basketball players from Luanda
Angolan men's basketball players
Small forwards
C.D. Primeiro de Agosto men's basketball players
C.R.D. Libolo basketball players
African Games gold medalists for Angola
African Games medalists in basketball
2014 FIBA Basketball World Cup players
Competitors at the 2015 African Games